Overhead wire markers are safety instruments applied to the overhead power lines marking transmission lines and ropeways along the flight path during the day.
 Markers are often installed on overhead lines near airfields, or at river crossings where there is a possibility of float-equipped aircraft using the river. Some markers contain conductor marking lights or strobe lights to improve visibility at night or in fog.

See also 
 Balisor

Notes and references 

Electric power distribution
Aviation safety